The crimson-collared tanager (Ramphocelus sanguinolentus) is a rather small Middle American songbird. It was first described by the French naturalist René-Primevère Lesson in 1831, its specific epithet from the Latin adjective sanguinolentus, "bloodied", referring to its red plumage.

Taxonomy
This species is sometimes placed in a genus of its own as Phlogothraupis sanguinolenta, and a genetic study suggests that it is less closely related to the other Ramphocelus tanagers than they are to each other. Its closest relative is the masked crimson tanager.

Description
The adult plumage is black with a red collar covering the nape, neck, and breast (remarkably similar to the pattern of the male crimson-collared grosbeak). All tail coverts are also red. The bill is striking pale blue and the legs are blue-gray. In adults, the irides are crimson, contrary to what is shown in Howell and Webb. Females average slightly duller than males, but are sometimes indistinguishable from them. Juvenile birds are similar except that the hood is dull red, the black areas are tinged with brown, and the breast is mottled red and black. Young birds also have a duller bill color.

Vocalizations are high-pitched and sibilant. There are several calls; one rendered as ssii-p is given both when perched and in flight.  The song is jerky and consists of two-to-four-note phrases separated by pauses, tueee-teew, chu-chee-wee-chu, teweee.

Distribution and habitat
The crimson-collared tanager ranges from southern Veracruz and northern Oaxaca in Mexico through the Atlantic slope of Central America, to the highlands of western Panama.  It inhabits the edges of humid evergreen forests and second growth, where it is often seen in pairs at middle to upper levels.

Behaviour

Breeding
The nest is a cup built of such materials as moss, rootlets and strips of large leaves such as banana or Heliconia, and is placed at middle height in a tree at a forest edge. The female usually lays two eggs, pale blue with blackish spots.

Conservation
Because the species is not threatened, the population size is very large and the trend appears to be stable, the species is evaluated as Least Concern.

References

 

crimson-collared tanager
Birds of Central America
Birds of Belize
crimson-collared tanager
Taxa named by René Lesson